Krems-Langenlois Airport is a public use airport located  north-northeast of Krems, Niederösterreich, Austria.

See also
List of airports in Austria

References

External links 
 www.airfield-krems.eu
 Airport record for Krems-Langenlois Airport at Landings.com
 

Airports in Lower Austria